Quentin Vincent (born 20 March 1994) is a French badminton player. In 2013, he won Romanian International tournament in men's doubles event with his brother Sébastien Vincent.

Achievements

BWF International Challenge/Series 
Men's doubles

  BWF International Challenge tournament
  BWF International Series tournament
  BWF Future Series tournament

References

External links 
 

1993 births
Living people
French male badminton players